The 1977 All-East football team consists of American football players chosen by various selectors as the best players at each position among the Eastern colleges and universities during the 1977 NCAA Division I football season.

Offense

Quarterback
 Leamon Hall, Army (AP-1)

Running backs
 Joe Gattuso, Navy (AP-1)
 John Pagliaro, Yale (AP-1)

Tight end
 Mickey Shuler, Penn State (AP-1)

Wide receivers
 Clennie Brundidge, Army (AP-1)
 Gordon Jones, Pitt (AP-1)

Tackles
 Matt Carroll, Pitt (AP-1)
 Keith Dorney, Penn State (AP-1)

Guards
 Steve Carfora, Yale (AP-1)
 John Schmeding, Boston College (AP-1)

Center
 Tom Brzoza, Pitt (AP-1)

Defense

Ends
 Hugh Green, Pitt (AP-1)
 Chuck Schott, Army (AP-1)

Tackles
 Ken Clarke, Syracuse (AP-1)
 Randy Holloway, Pitt (AP-1)

Middle guard
 Randy Sidler, Penn State (AP-1)

Linebackers
 Doug Curtis, Colgate (AP-1)
 Rick Donaldson, Penn State (AP-1)
 Rich Scudellari, Boston College (AP-1)

Defensive backs 
 Bob Jury, Pitt (AP-1)
 Larry King, Syracuse (AP-1)
 John Sturges, Navy (AP-1)

Key
 AP = Associated Press
 UPI = United Press International

See also
 1977 College Football All-America Team

References

All-Eastern
All-Eastern college football teams